The 1992-93 Anglo-Italian Cup was the fifth staging of the Anglo-Italian Cup, an annual association football tournament between clubs from England and Italy.

Background
The competition was re-established in 1992–93 as a replacement for the Full Members' Cup. It was a professional tournament for teams competing in the second tier of football—the newly renamed First Division in England and Serie B in Italy.

The final was a single match played at Wembley, with Derby County losing 3–1 to Cremonese.

Final

References

External links
Full Results from the 1992-93 competition at Statto
Full Results from the 1992-93 competition at RSSSF

Anglo-Italian Cup
Anglo-Italian Cup
Anglo-Italian Cup